1+1 is a national Ukrainian language TV channel, owned by 1+1 Media Group. It has the second largest geographic reach of any channel in Ukraine, covering 95% of Ukraine's territory.

History
1+1 TV channel was founded in August 1995, headed by its original president Alexander Rodnyansky who also was its general director from 1996 to 2002. In 2002 he joined STS Media and since 2004 he has been the president of that Delaware-registered Russian company.

It immediately became a major force in the Ukrainian TV industry, even though in the very beginning the channel's programming consisted solely of movie broadcasts. Its first broadcast was within two months of its founding, in September 1995, and since 1997 has been broadcasting continuously on the second channel of the Ukrainian national TV network UT-2 (liter.: "Druhyj zagalnonatsionalnyj kanal"), with an appropriate license of the Ukrainian National Television and Radio Council. 

From the start, the channel was very successful, despite its initial  limited programming. Until 2004 1+1 broadcast only for 15 hours. Its program schedule was from 7 am until 10 am, followed by a break for four hours with the UT-2 channel from 10 am until 1+1 backs, and then from 2 pm until 2 am. Beginning on 30 June 2004 the channel was given official permission to broadcast 24 hours each day. Since then, 1+1 has been able to create a complete round-the-clock broadcast schedule.

1+1 has recently become available on DIRECTV Stream and is broadcasting News from Ukraine throughout the day.

Programming and current schedule

1+1 was the first TV project in Ukraine to start actively inviting popular TV stars and other celebrities to take part in their live shows. 
Since the start of Russia's 2022 invasion of Ukraine, 1+1 is participating in the United News telethon, and is not broadcasting any other programs. On December 25, 2022, 1+1 International, has been renamed to "1+1 Ukraine" to broadcast 1+1 entertainment content.

The following is a list of most popular programmes offered to 1+1 viewers:

TSN 

Television Service of News (TSN) is a news service programme, which has been operating on the channel from the start, and even its presenters have mainly remained the same. Such names as Ala Mazur (on TSN since January 3, 1997; in 1996, 1998, 1999, and 2001 was awarded the best news presenter of the year), Ljudmyla Dobrovolska, Oles Tereshenko and some others are very familiar to those who live in Ukraine, and according to the research, these people have the highest level of trust among news viewers. The TSN series airs daily at 7:30 pm except Saturday. Oles Tereshenko leads the concluding TSN series of a day at midnight and a week as well every Sunday at 7:30 pm with the overview of political, social, and cultural life of Ukraine and the world.

Breakfast with 1+1 

Working actively since 2002, Breakfast is the early morning programme, offering viewers a fun way to spend the morning. Originally, it was the Monday to Friday Breakfast, but since 2006 a weekend breakfast has been "cooked" as well, adding such activities to its "menu" as "Fitness", "Fashion Stuffs", "Relax!", and "Don't sleep and travel". The programme offers an interactive area on its website.

The Voice of Ukraine 

A reality talent show. Holos Krainy is part of the international syndication The Voice based on the reality singing competition launched in the Netherlands as The Voice of Holland, created by Dutch television producer John de Mol.

Wife Swap 

Reality television programme, part of international syndication Wife Swap. Two families, usually from different social classes and lifestyles, swap wives/mothers – and sometimes husbands – for two weeks.

Four Weddings 

Reality television programme, based on the UK version of the same name. Four brides attend each other's weddings and rate them on their Dress, Ceremony, Food and Reception out of thirty marks.

Dancing with the Stars 

Dance competition television series, part of international syndication of the same name. The format of the show consists of a celebrity paired with a professional dancer. Each couple performs predetermined dances and competes against the others for judges' points and audience votes. The couple receiving the lowest combined total of judges' points and audience votes is eliminated each week until only the champion dance pair remains.

Evening Quarter 

Vechirnii Kvartal is a comedy series developed by Kvartal 95 Studio, created by Volodymyr Zelensky, a series that has been broadcast on TV channel since 2012. The members of comedy team of the same name tell the audience jokes, perform comedy numbers in a satire manner.

Social projects
 There are no children without parents – the joint project of 1+1, the Family and Youth Ministry and the Center of Child Adoption
 Last myth – Victor Suvorov's discussion of the historical events presented in this documentary investigation

Political projects
 Election 2006 - long-term TV-marathon on March 26–27, 2006
 2006 elections - live TV debates for parties and political coalitions
 Debates 2002 – election run up coverage
 Five by Five – election run up coverage
 The Night of Choice – coverage of presidential electoral campaign in Ukraine on the night of October 31/November 1 and November 14/15 1999
 Space bridges – live space bridges with the most popular in their countries' TV channels GRT (Russia) and POLSAT (Poland)
 Dialogues with Democracy – the meeting of  the US Secretary of State Madeleine Albright with the Ukrainian youth
 US President Bill Clinton's address to the Ukrainian people
 Big Race – the first and unique experience of satirical coverage of the current political life of the Ukraine

Awards and recognitions
The brand of the channel has become a traditional sign of quality in Ukrainian TV industry. The company's work and separate presenters have been recognized and highly evaluated not only by national specialists and experts in TV production, but also by many international experts and at TV forums.

Criticism

In 1999, after 1+1 had been broadcasting on UT-2 24h per day for two years with an appropriate license, the channel sent a claim to the Supreme Court of Ukraine requesting the TV company AITI, who used to hire UT-2 four hours of broadcasting time earlier before, to give up its license as it had stopped its programming for a year. In the year 2000 the claim was decided for the 1+1 preference.

Channel 1+1 has been the subject of continuing criticism during the 2004 presidential election, when it was heavily criticized for twisting information in favor of Viktor Yanukovych (Prime Minister of Ukraine at the time). Such behavior was typical for a Ukrainian-wide channel, because all of the media were under heavy pressure from the Administration of the President of President Kuchma. Furthermore, critics accused the channel of being part of the Social Democratic Party of Ukraine empire.

In late November 2004 several journalists left the channel in protest against this pressure and almost all leading presenters had refused to report news. Those actions altogether with similar actions on other channels marked the beginning of the Orange revolution.

In October 2006 Alexander Rodnyansky, the General Producer of Studio 1+1, won a hard appeal process in the Supreme Court of Ukraine, after the court gave ownership of 70% of the company's shares to Ihor Kolomoyskyi, and as he had claimed, in June 2005 there was an agreement signed between himself and Rodnyansky, that 70% of the company's shares were sold to Kolomyyskyy (for ~US$70 million).

On the 2014–2015 New Year night the 80th Disco TV program was shown on 1+1. Oleg Gazmanov participated in it. He is one of the signatories of the petition in support of Russian actions in Crimea and Eastern Ukraine in 2014. That caused a scandal in Ukrainian society. The National Council on Television and Radio of Ukraine promised to review all facts of violation of broadcast regulations by Ukrainian TV and radio companies on the New Year night.

See also
 Vitalii Sediuk

References

External links

 
1+1 International

Television stations in Ukraine
Television channels and stations established in 1995
Ukrainian brands
Ukrainian-language television stations in Ukraine
1995 establishments in Ukraine
1+1 Media Group